The Webster School District is a public school district in Day County, based in Webster, South Dakota.

Schools
The Webster School District has one elementary school, one middle school, and one high school in one large building which is where the school district administrative office is.

Elementary schools 
Webster Elementary School

Middle school
Webster Middle School

High school
Webster High School

References

External links
Webster School District

School districts in South Dakota